High Hurstwood is a village in the Wealden district of East Sussex.

External links
 High Hurstwood village history
 Holy Trinity Church, High Hurstwood
 High Hurstwood Church of England Primary School

Villages in East Sussex
Buxted